"First Man" is a song by Cuban-American singer Camila Cabello from her second studio album Romance (2019), on which it appears as the fourteenth and final track. It was written by Cabello alongside Amy Wadge and Jordan Reynolds, the latter producing it with Finneas. The song was announced as the album's seventh and final single on June 21, 2020. An official music video for "First Man" was released the previous day, in celebration of Father's Day. It features clips from Cabello's childhood with many of the footage containing videos of her and her father.

"First Man" peaked at number 94 on the US Billboard Hot 100, following Cabello's live performance of the song at the 62nd Grammy Awards. Musically, "First Man" is a pop rock piano ballad. Lyrically, the song is about Cabello's relationship with her father while she is in a romantic relationship with a "good guy".

Background and composition
"First Man" was confirmed with the album's track list  on November 29, 2019.

It was written by Camila Cabello, Jordan Reynolds and Amy Wadge. It runs for three minutes and forty-nine seconds. "First Man" is a pop-rock piano ballad. Cabello wrote the song about her relationship with her father while she is in a romantic relationship with a "good guy." In terms of music notation, "First Man" was composed using  common time in the key of G Major, with a tempo of 100 beats per minute. Cabello's vocal range spans from the low note D3 to the high note of D5, giving the song two octaves of range. The tempo has a passionate feel.

Music video
The official music video for the song was released on Cabello's YouTube channel on June 21, 2020, in celebration of Father's Day.

The video features clips from Cabello's childhood with many of the footage containing videos of her and her father. Cabello watches the footage on a television while singing to her dad. In the description Cabello dedicated the video to her father.

Live performances
On November 2, 2019, Camila performed the song on New Music Daily Presents: Camila Cabello, a special live show from New Music Daily of Apple Music in the heart of Los Angeles celebrating the release of her album Romance. Cabello performed "First Man" at the 62nd Grammy Awards ceremony that took place at the Staples Center in Los Angeles on January 26, 2020.

Commercial performance
Just one day after the Grammy awards ceremony, sales of "First Man" had already increased by over 68,000%, and that rose to over 81,000% a day later. In those two days, the track sold over 11,000 copies. The cut was also the fourth-most-streamed song the day after the Grammys. The track racked up 1.4 million streams in the 24 hours following an increase of 890%. In the US, "First Man" debuted at number 94 on the Billboard Hot 100, becoming Cabello's 16th career entry. In New Zealand the song peaked at number 34 on the Hot Singles chart.

Track listings

Credits and personnel
Credits adapted from the liner notes of Romance.

Publishing
 Published by Sony/ATV Songs LLC (BMI) o/b/o Sony/ATV Music Publishing (UK) LTD/Maidmetal Limited (PRS)/Milamoon Songs (BMI) / WC Music Corp. o/b/o itself. Buckeye25 (ASCAP) and Jreynmusic (ASCAP) / WC Music Corp. (ASCAP) o/b/o itself. Cookie Jar Music LLP (ASCAP) and Warner Chappell Music Ltd.

Recording
 Recorded by Jordan Reynolds at Jordan's House, Nashville, Tennessee
 Mixed by Serban Ghenea at MixStar Studios, Virginia Beach, Virginia
 Mastered at the Mastering Palace, New York City, New York

Personnel

 Camila Cabello – lead vocals, songwriting
 Jordan Reynolds – production, songwriting
 Finneas – production
 Amy Wadge – songwriting
 John Hanes – engineering
 Serban Ghenea – mixing
 Dave Kutch – mastering

Charts

Release history

Notes

References

2019 songs
2020 singles
Camila Cabello songs
Song recordings produced by Finneas O'Connell
Songs about fathers
Songs written by Camila Cabello
Songs written by Amy Wadge
Songs written by Jordan Reynolds
Pop ballads
American pop rock songs